Knowledge Web is the name of four different projects:
 The Knowledge Web Project supervised by James Burke
 A project under the European Sixth Framework Program
 An example of a knowledge web software platform is the Jumper 2.0 open source project
 The Knowledge Web created by AFAC (Australasian Fire and Emergency Service Authorities Council previously Australasian Fire Authorities Council) for collaboration on Fire and Emergency Services for Australasia